Babuzai (also spelled: Babozai) (Pashto: بابوزي) is a Pashtun tribe. BABUZAI IS SUB TRIBE OF YOUSAFZAI

History 
Babuzai is named after Babu (Often called: Baizai). There is a tradition among Pashtuns that they name the tribe after the name of that person from whom the clan or tribe has been initiated, the descendant are named after their first ancestor. for instance, Babu is the name of a person, his descendant until now are called Babuzai.

See also 
 Khalil (Pashtun tribe)
 Qais Abdur Rashid

References

Further reading 

 Ewans Martin, (2002) Afghanistan: a short history of its people and politics: Publisher Perennial
 Romano, Amy (2003). A Historical Atlas of Afghanistan. The Rosen Publishing Group. p. 28. . Retrieved 2010-10-17.
 Khan, Roshan (1986). Yūsufzaʼī qaum kī sarguzasht. Karachi: Roshan Khan and Company.
 Khan, Roshan (1983). Malika-e Swat, 1st Edition, 1983: Roshan Khan and Company.
Tawarikh-e Hafiz Rehmat Khani, 3rd Edition, 1977, Peshawar Pushtu Academy, Peshawar University.
Afghano ki Nasli Tarikh, 1st Edition, 1981, Karachi Roshan Khan and Company.
Baba-ye Qaum Sheikhmali (RA), 1st Edition, 1985, Roshan Khan and Company, Phool Chowk, Karachi, Pakistan.
 Haravi Nimat Allah, History of the Afghans, Translated: S. M. Imamuddin, Dhaka, 1960

Pashtun tribes